Frithiof Edvard Henrik Nevanlinna (16 August 1894 – 20 March 1977) was a Finnish mathematician and professor who worked on classical and complex analysis. He was born in Joensuu, and was the older brother of Rolf Nevanlinna.

Publications

References

External links

1894 births
1977 deaths
People from Joensuu
People from Kuopio Province (Grand Duchy of Finland)
Finnish mathematicians
Academic staff of the University of Helsinki